Gajanan Dharmshi Babar  (1 March 1943 – 2 February 2022) was an Indian politician.

Biography
He was a member of the 15th Lok Sabha. He represented the Maval (Lok Sabha constituency) in Pune District of Maharashtra and was a member of the Shiv Sena political party.

Babar was the member of Standing Committee On Urban Development from 31 August 2009 to 30 August 2011 and Standing Committee on Rural Development. He was also a member of Standing Committee on Chemical & Fertilizer and Consultative Committee for the Ministry of Defence, and a member of the Parliamentary Committee on Official Language (First Sub-Committee).

In January 2016, he joined Bharatiya Janata Party in the presence of Chief Minister of Maharashtra Devendra Fadnavis and Pune district guardian minister Girish Bapat.

He died from COVID-19 in Pune on 2 February 2022, at the age of 78.

External links
 Official biographical sketch in Parliament of India website

References 

1943 births
2022 deaths
India MPs 2009–2014
People from Maharashtra
Shiv Sena politicians
Marathi politicians
Lok Sabha members from Maharashtra
People from Satara district
People from Pimpri-Chinchwad
Maharashtra municipal councillors
Bharatiya Janata Party politicians from Maharashtra
Deaths from the COVID-19 pandemic in India